In enzymology, a 4-hydroxybenzoate—CoA ligase is an enzyme that catalyzes the chemical reaction

ATP + 4-hydroxybenzoate + CoA  AMP + diphosphate + 4-hydroxybenzoyl-CoA

The 3 substrates of this enzyme are ATP, 4-hydroxybenzoate, and CoA, whereas its 3 products are AMP, diphosphate, and 4-hydroxybenzoyl-CoA.

This enzyme belongs to the family of ligases, specifically those forming carbon-sulfur bonds as acid-thiol ligases.  The systematic name of this enzyme class is 4-hydroxybenzoate:CoA ligase (AMP-forming). Other names in common use include 4-hydroxybenzoate-CoA synthetase, 4-hydroxybenzoate-coenzyme A ligase (AMP-forming), 4-hydroxybenzoyl coenzyme A synthetase, and 4-hydroxybenzoyl-CoA ligase.  This enzyme participates in benzoate degradation via coa ligation.

References

 

EC 6.2.1
Enzymes of unknown structure